The 2007 Black Reel Awards, which annually recognize and celebrate the achievements of black people in feature, independent and television films, took place in Washington, D.C. on February 7, 2007. Dreamgirls was the bigger winner of the evening, taking home six awards, with Walkout taking home five awards.

Winners and nominees
Winners are listed first and highlighted in bold.

References

2007 in American cinema
2007 awards in the United States
Black Reel Awards
2006 film awards